Cucu Suryaningsih or known her under stage name Evie Tamala (born June 23, 1969) is a popular Indonesian dangdut singer-songwriter. Evie became popular mainly because of her singles Selamat Malam, Cinta Ketok Magic, and Dokter Cinta.

Discography

Studio albums
 Tang Ting Tong Der (1988)
 Dokter Cinta (1989)
 Hari-Hari Cinta (1990)
 Aduh Sayang (1991)
 Rambut (1992)
 Kangmas (1994)
 Rembulan Malam (1994)
 Selamat Malam (1995)
 Duka & Lukaku (1996)
 Suara Hati (1997)
 Best Of The Best Evie Tamala 1999 (1999)
 Kasmaran (1999)
 Album Cinta (2000)
 Best of the Best Evie Tamala - AMI Sharp Award (2000)
 Kerinduan (2001)
 Asmara (2002)
 Selamat Datang Cinta (2005)
 Getar Suara Hati (2006)
 Indahnya (2006)

Sundanese Pop studio albums
 Cinta Ketok Magic (1991)
 Cinta Parabola (1992)
 Tunggara (2001)
 Angin Peuting (2010)

Javanese Pop studio albums
 Kangen (1993)
 Yogya Priyangan (1994)

References

External links
  Evie Tamala on Disctarra.com
  Evie Tamala on Kapanlagi.com
 Evie Tamala on iTunes
 Evie Tamala on Last.fm

1969 births
Living people
People from Tasikmalaya
Sundanese people
21st-century Indonesian women singers
Indonesian people of Malay descent
Indonesian dangdut singers
Anugerah Musik Indonesia winners
20th-century Indonesian women singers